Acharya Prafulla Chandra Roy Government College, is state-government owned undergraduate college, which was established in 2010, is the government degree college in Himachal Vihar, Siliguri,  Darjeeling district. APC Roy is the second government funded undergraduate college after Acharya Brojendra Nath Seal College. It offers undergraduate courses in science and arts. It is affiliated to University of North Bengal.

Departments

Science
Physics
Chemistry
Mathematics
Computer Science
Botany
Zoology

Arts
Bengali
English
Economics
Political Science
Sociology

See also

References

External links 

University of North Bengal
University Grants Commission
National Assessment and Accreditation Council

Universities and colleges in Darjeeling district
Colleges affiliated to University of North Bengal
Educational institutions established in 2010
2010 establishments in West Bengal